Ongaonga is a village in Central Hawkes Bay District of New Zealand's North Island. It is located 20 kilometres west of Waipawa and a similar distance from Waipukurau.

The village was founded in 1872 when Henry Hamilton Bridge subdivided his farm. The first house was built two years later, in 1874. The general store and tearooms was opened in 1899 and still provides the local community and visitors with groceries, refreshments, postal services and petrol.

The village is named after the Māori word for the native stinging nettle Urtica ferox.

The modern village consists of a general store, tea rooms and the Sandford Arms Tavern. Ongaonga has a collection of historic buildings all built at a similar time by the Coles Brothers Builders and Joiners. The main street, Bridge Street, named after town founder Henry Hamilton Bridge, includes the historic Coles Brothers factory.

The small country town also supports several sporting and cultural clubs. Ongaonga often joins with Tikokino in rugby, to compete against other Central Hawke's Bay clubs. Ongaonga also hosts an annual ANZAC day parade. The Ongaonga Golf Course is located one kilometre south-west of the town.

Demographics
At the time of the 2018 census, the SA1 statistical areas were larger than this, and Ongaonga was contained in one SA1 area covering . Both the rural settlement area and the SA1 area are part of the larger Makaretu statistical area.

The SA1 area had a population of 168 at the 2018 New Zealand census, an increase of 3 people (1.8%) since the 2013 census, and a decrease of 21 people (−11.1%) since the 2006 census. There were 72 households, comprising 84 males and 87 females, giving a sex ratio of 0.97 males per female. The median age was 55.9 years (compared with 37.4 years nationally), with 18 people (10.7%) aged under 15 years, 18 (10.7%) aged 15 to 29, 87 (51.8%) aged 30 to 64, and 45 (26.8%) aged 65 or older.

Ethnicities were 92.9% European/Pākehā, 16.1% Māori, and 1.8% Asian. People may identify with more than one ethnicity.

Although some people chose not to answer the census's question about religious affiliation, 57.1% had no religion, 33.9% were Christian, and 1.8% had Māori religious beliefs.

Of those at least 15 years old, 18 (12.0%) people had a bachelor's or higher degree, and 36 (24.0%) people had no formal qualifications. The median income was $25,400, compared with $31,800 nationally. 12 people (8.0%) earned over $70,000 compared to 17.2% nationally. The employment status of those at least 15 was that 78 (52.0%) people were employed full-time, 27 (18.0%) were part-time, and 3 (2.0%) were unemployed.

Makaretu statistical area

Makaretu had a population of 2,430 at the 2018 New Zealand census, an increase of 135 people (5.9%) since the 2013 census, and an increase of 186 people (8.3%) since the 2006 census. There were 867 households, comprising 1,263 males and 1,170 females, giving a sex ratio of 1.08 males per female. The median age was 42.2 years (compared with 37.4 years nationally), with 528 people (21.7%) aged under 15 years, 357 (14.7%) aged 15 to 29, 1,170 (48.1%) aged 30 to 64, and 378 (15.6%) aged 65 or older.

Ethnicities were 83.1% European/Pākehā, 19.6% Māori, 2.6% Pacific peoples, 5.7% Asian, and 1.0% other ethnicities. People may identify with more than one ethnicity.

The percentage of people born overseas was 14.7, compared with 27.1% nationally.

Although some people chose not to answer the census's question about religious affiliation, 48.4% had no religion, 39.9% were Christian, 2.1% had Māori religious beliefs, 0.1% were Hindu, 0.1% were Muslim, 0.6% were Buddhist and 2.0% had other religions.

Of those at least 15 years old, 279 (14.7%) people had a bachelor's or higher degree, and 408 (21.5%) people had no formal qualifications. The median income was $31,300, compared with $31,800 nationally. 213 people (11.2%) earned over $70,000 compared to 17.2% nationally. The employment status of those at least 15 was that 1,056 (55.5%) people were employed full-time, 315 (16.6%) were part-time, and 48 (2.5%) were unemployed.

Education
Ongaonga School is a Year 1–8 co-educational state primary school.

Ongaonga Play Center and Ongaonga Town Hall are located next to the school.

Over the last 50 years, youth organisations have come and gone. The town has hosted Scouts New Zealand and Girl Guides.

References

Central Hawke's Bay District
Populated places in the Hawke's Bay Region